DME may refer to:

Organisations
 Dubai Mercantile Exchange, a market in Dubai, United Arab Emirates
 Dakota, Minnesota and Eastern Railroad, a railroad in the United States
 Disney's Magical Express, an airport transportation service for Walt Disney World
 Domodedovo International Airport, one of the airports serving Moscow, Russia (IATA code DME)
 United States District Court for the District of Maine
 Diversified Metal Engineering Ltd., Canadian company that designs and fabricates equipment for Brewing, and other applications.
 Durium Marche Estere, an Italian record label; imprint of Durium.
 Detroit Mold Engineering, a Hillenbrand business.

Technology
 Direct Machine Environment, a 1900 order code microcode subsystem for the ICL 2900 Series computing system
 Distance measuring equipment (aviation), a navigation aid used in aviation.
 Diastatic malt extract, used in home-brewing
 Dropping mercury electrode, a working electrode made of mercury and used in polarography
 Digital Multi Effects, a feature name from Sony, generally called DVE: Digital Video Effects

Medicine
 Diabetic macular edema, an ophthalmological disease
 Durable medical equipment, a classification of medical devices which refers to therapeutic items prescribed by a doctor for repeated use, such as wheelchairs, crutches, kidney machines, ventilators, or CPAP machines.

Chemicals
 Dimethoxyethane, a common solvent used in chemistry laboratories
 Dimethylethanolamine, precursor molecule for C-choline
 Dimethyl ether, a fuel and an aerosol spray propellant
 DME (psychedelic), 3,4-dimethoxy-beta-hydroxyphenethylamine, a psychedelic drug

Other
 Design Management Europe Award, a European Design Management prize